The Watt From Pedro Show is a music radio show and podcast hosted by bassist, vocalist and songwriter Mike Watt.

Background
In the late 1990s, Watt began hosting a program on a Pirate radio station in Silver Lake, Los Angeles. After the FCC shut down the station, Watt's friends suggested he take his show online. The program debuted on May 19, 2001. On January 10, 2006, The Watt from Pedro Show became available as a podcast.

, the show has aired more than 500 episodes.

Format

Each episode begins with a John Coltrane song then Watt and "Brother Matt" play "eclectic mix of underground music" (Watt refuses to play "mersh shit") and interview guests about their musical history and other topics.

Watt has interviewed Barrence Whitfield, Flea, Andrea Belfi and Stefano Pilia of Il Sogno del Marinaio, Sam McCandless, and Paul Leary among others.

Reception
Orange County Register called it one of "5 musician-hosted podcasts we've got on heavy rotation" and Rolling Stone included it in "7 Musicians' Podcasts You Need to Hear."

See also 

 Music podcast

References

External links
 

Music podcasts
Audio podcasts
2001 radio programme debuts
2006 podcast debuts